Albert Anthony Ten Eyck Brown (1878–1940) was an architect active in Atlanta, Georgia and other areas. Brown was born in Albany, New York. He studied at the New York Academy of Design.

Several of his works are listed on the U.S. National Register of Historic Places.

Buildings
Buildings designed by Ten Eyck Brown include:

Miami, Florida
Dade County Courthouse (1925–28), 73 W. Flagler St., NRHP-listed
Miami Coliseum (1927), 1500 Douglas Rd.

Atlanta, Georgia
(in Downtown Atlanta unless otherwise specified)
 Arlington Hall (1918–19) at Lanier University, Morningside-Lenox Park neighborhood
Bass Furniture Building (1898), 142–150 Mitchell St., NRHP-listed
 Clark Howell Homes (1939–41)
Fulton County Courthouse (1911–1914), 160 Pryor St., SW, NRHP-listed
 Peachtree Arcade (1917–1918), 2 Peachtree St., demolished
 St. Anthony of Padua Catholic Church (1908–1923) in the West End neighborhood
Spotswood Hall (1913, remodeled 1933), residence, 555 Argonne Dr., NW, Buckhead, NRHP-listed
 State Bar of Georgia Building (1918, renovated 1920–1922?), formerly the Federal Reserve Bank of Atlanta
 Sweet Auburn Curb Market (1923)
Thornton Building (1932), 10 Pryor St. (10 Park Place South), NRHP-listed
United States Post Office, Federal Annex (1931–33), now the Martin Luther King Jr. Federal Building, 77 Forsyth St., NRHP-listed

Atlanta neighborhoods
One or more works in the following Atlanta neighborhoods:
 Ansley Park (houses, 1910s)
 Druid Hills (houses, 1910s)
Pittsburgh, NRHP-listed
Virginia-Highland, NRHP-listed

Outside Atlanta
Albany Municipal Auditorium, 301 Pine Ave., NRHP-listed (1915)
 Athens: buildings in the Downtown Athens Historic District, NRHP-listed
Canton: Cherokee County Courthouse, 100 North St., NRHP-listed
Columbus: Silver's Five and Dime Store—H.L. Green Co., 1101–1103 Broadway, NRHP-listed
Dublin: One or more works in Dublin Commercial Historic District, roughly centered on Jackson Ave. and Lawrence St., NRHP-listed
Spalding County Courthouse (1910) burned down in 1981.

Tennessee
Nashville: 226 N. 3rd Ave., NRHP-listed

References

Further reading
Robert M. Craig, Atlanta Architecture: Art Deco to Modern Classic, 1929–1959 (Gretna, La.: Pelican, 1995)

20th-century American architects
History of Atlanta
Architects from Albany, New York
Architects from Atlanta
1878 births
1940 deaths
American people of Dutch descent